Philip Stanhope Worsley (12 August 1835 – 8 May 1866) was an English poet.

Life
The son of the Rev. Charles Worsley, he was educated at Highgate School, where he made a lasting impression on Gerard Manley Hopkins, a fellow pupil in his boarding house, and Corpus Christi College, Oxford, where he won the Newdigate prize in 1857 with a poem on The Temple of Janus.  In 1861 he published a translation of the Odyssey, followed in 1865 by a translation of the first twelve books of the Iliad, in both of which he employed the Spenserian stanza with success.

In 1863, he published a volume of Poems and Translations. His unfinished translation of the Iliad was completed after his death by John Conington.

References

External links

1835 births
1866 deaths
People educated at Highgate School
English male poets
19th-century English poets
19th-century British male writers
Translators of Homer